Macaca  (feminine) and macaco  (masculine) are the Portuguese words for "monkey" (compare English macaque). In Portugal and Portuguese-speaking countries, macaco (plural macacos) is used as a racial slur against black people.

Similarly the word "macaque" was used as a racial slur by Belgians in their African colonies.

Etymology and usage
According to Robert Edgerton, in the Belgian Congo, colonial whites called Africans macaques—implying that they had lived in the trees until the Europeans arrived. The term sale macaque (filthy monkey) was occasionally used as an insult. In the ceremony in 1960 in which Congo gained its independence from Belgium, Prime Minister Patrice Lumumba gave a speech accusing Belgian King Baudouin of presiding over "a regime of injustice, suppression, and exploitation" before ad-libbing at the end, Nous ne sommes plus vos macaques! (We are no longer your macaques!)  Lumumba had previously been called a sale macaque by a Belgian person.

In the Adventures of Tintin written by Belgian writer-artist Hergé, Captain Haddock uses the term macaque as an insult, along with other random terms. In a 1994 essay, literary scholar Patrick Colm Hogan discussed the racist symbolism surrounding the name Makak, the protagonist in Derek Walcott's 1967 play Dream on Monkey Mountain.<ref>Hogan, Patrick Colm. Mimeticism, Reactionary Nativism, and the Possibility of Postcolonial Identity in Derek Walcott's Dream on Monkey Mountain. Research in African Literatures Vol 25 Iss 2 (1994): 103-19, p. 103</ref>

Journalist Taki Theodoracopulos referred to Bianca Jagger, who is of Nicaraguan origin, as macaca mulatta in 1996. Theodoracopulos has frequently used racial slurs in his published work.The Guardian leader 21 October 2004 In fact Macaca mulatta is the scientific name for the rhesus monkey.

1996 Olé incident
In 1996, during Olé's first year of life, the Argentinian national sports daily newspaper was the centre of a scandal. 

After the Argentinian Olympic football team's qualification to the final of the 1996 Olympic Games, the newspaper published on Wednesday July 31, 1996 the headline "Let the macaques come", in reference to the remaining semifinal match played between the teams of Brazil and Nigeria. Due to the criticism received by the headline, the newspaper had to publish an apology, although it did not face any consequences.ACTUALIDADAbril 2005¿Racistas nosotros? on Para Ti, 24 Sep 2015

 2006 George Allen incident 

The failed re-election campaign of Republican U.S. Senator George Allen of Virginia generated much controversy after he used the word macaca in reference to a person of Indian ancestry. On 11 August 2006, at a campaign stop in Breaks, Virginia, near the Kentucky border, George Allen twice used the word macaca to refer to S. R. Sidarth, who was filming the event as a "tracker" for the opposing Jim Webb campaign.

Sidarth is an Indian American and was born and raised in Fairfax County, Virginia. Even though Allen claimed that he made up the word and said that he did not understand its derogatory meaning, a media outcry erupted following his use of the term. After two weeks of negative publicity, Allen publicly apologized for his statement and asserted that he in no way intended those words to be offensive.

Relating to the Allen controversy, "macaca" was named the most politically incorrect word of 2006 by Global Language Monitor, a non-profit group that studies word usage.  The word was also a finalist for the American Dialect Society "Word of the Year" that same year.

The term "Macacawitz", referring to the September 2006 discovery of Allen's Jewish heritage (specifically Tunisian Jewish), was coined by conservative pundit John Podhoretz as a headline for a post in the National Review blog "The Corner". A field organizer for Democratic Congressional candidate Al Weed resigned after she used the term in email to supporters of Weed.

The controversy created by Allen's use of the term contributed to his narrow loss to Webb.

See also
Monkey chanting

 References 

 External links 

Video of the George Allen (R) statement at YouTube
Macaca Named Top Politically Incorrect Term of 2006 from Global Language Monitor
 Wilson, Chris  (26 April 2011). Wikipedia's "Macaca" Problem. Slate magazine.''

Anti-black racism in the United States
Anti-African and anti-black slurs
Monkeys in popular culture